Tufft Nunatak is a small nunatak 3 nautical miles (6 km) southwest of Mount Bradley and 4.6 km south of Senokos Nunatak, Trinity Peninsula in Graham Land, Antarctica. Named by United Kingdom Antarctic Place-Names Committee (UK-APC) for Roger Tufft of the Falkland Islands Dependencies Survey (FIDS), a member of the reconnaissance party for the Detroit Plateau journey in February 1957.

Map
 Trinity Peninsula. Scale 1:250000 topographic map No. 5697. Institut für Angewandte Geodäsie and British Antarctic Survey, 1996.

References
 SCAR Composite Antarctic Gazetteer.

Nunataks of Trinity Peninsula